Oleksandr Ivanovych Yatsenko (born 24 February 1985) is a Ukrainian former football player. He currently works at Helios Kharkiv youth academy. He played as a defender.

Club career
Yatsenko is a product of the Dynamo Kyiv youth system, and has featured 10 times for their senior team. He went on loan twice; first to Kharkiv in 2005, and in 2007 to Dnipro Dnipropetrovsk for the spring half of the 2006–07 season. In July 2007 he signed a three-year contract with FC Chornomorets Odesa.

International career
He has represented Ukraine at all levels. He was a semi-finalist at the 2004 UEFA European Under-19 Football Championship, and played in the 2005 FIFA World Youth Championship. He captained his team to a silver medal at the 2006 UEFA European Under-21 Football Championship. Yatsenko was called up to the 2006 FIFA World Cup Ukraine squad as a replacement for the injured players Serhiy Fedorov and Vyacheslav Shevchuk.

He currently has one cap for the senior Ukraine national football team, in a 1–0 friendly win over Japan on 12 October 2005.

Yatsenko was awarded the Order For Courage by President Viktor Yushchenko for his participation in the 2006 FIFA World Cup finals in Germany.

See also
 2005 FIFA World Youth Championship squads#Ukraine

Honours
Ukraine under-21
 UEFA Under-21 Championship: runner-up 2006

References

External links

1985 births
Living people
Footballers from Kyiv
Ukrainian footballers
Association football defenders
Ukraine international footballers
Ukraine youth international footballers
Ukraine under-21 international footballers
2006 FIFA World Cup players
Ukrainian expatriate footballers
Expatriate footballers in Belarus
Ukrainian expatriate sportspeople in Belarus
Ukrainian Premier League players
FC Dynamo Kyiv players
FC Dynamo-2 Kyiv players
FC Dynamo-3 Kyiv players
FC Kharkiv players
FC Dnipro players
FC Chornomorets Odesa players
FC Mariupol players
FC Belshina Bobruisk players
FC Helios Kharkiv players
FC Solli Plyus Kharkiv players
FC Viktoriya Mykolaivka players